The 4th Army was an army level command of the German Army in World War I.  It was formed on mobilization in August 1914 from the VI Army Inspection. The army was disbanded in 1919 during demobilization after the war.

History 
At the outset of war, the 4th Army, with the 5th Army, formed the center of the German armies on the Western Front, moving through Luxembourg and Belgium in support of the great wheel of the right wing that was to pin down and defeat the French armies. The 4th Army defeated Belgian forces on the frontier, drove the French out of the Ardennes and then encountered the British Expeditionary Force in the "Race to the Sea" at the First Battle of Ypres. The 4th Army faced the British in Flanders for the rest of the war, notably defending in the Battle of Passchendaele (1917), attacking in the 1918 German spring offensive and finally being pushed back in the Hundred Days Offensive from August 1918.

At the end of the war it was serving as part of Heeresgruppe Kronprinz Rupprecht.

Order of Battle, 30 October 1918 
By the end of the war, the 4th Army was organised as:

Commanders 
The 4th Army had the following commanders during its existence.

Glossary 
Armee-Abteilung or Army Detachment in the sense of "something detached from an Army".  It is not under the command of an Army so is in itself a small Army.
Armee-Gruppe or Army Group in the sense of a group within an Army and under its command, generally formed as a temporary measure for a specific task.
Heeresgruppe or Army Group in the sense of a number of armies under a single commander.

See also 

4th Army (Wehrmacht) for the equivalent formation in World War II
German Army order of battle (1914)
German Army order of battle, Western Front (1918)
Schlieffen Plan

References

Bibliography 

 
 

04
Military units and formations established in 1914
Military units and formations disestablished in 1919